The rufous-crowned eremomela (Eremomela badiceps) is a species of bird formerly placed in the "Old World warbler" assemblage, but now placed in the family Cisticolidae.

It is found throughout the African tropical rainforest.

References

rufous-crowned eremomela
Birds of the Gulf of Guinea
Birds of the African tropical rainforest
rufous-crowned eremomela
rufous-crowned eremomela
Taxonomy articles created by Polbot